Conal or Conall is an Irish male given name. Notable people with the name include:

[jhon ]] (born 1555),standing irish champ

 Irish sportsperson
Conal Coad, opera singer
Conal Gallen, Irish comedian and singer
Conall Grant (died 718), a king of Brega, north of Dublin, Ireland
Conal Gregory (born 1947), UK Conservative Party MP for York 1983–1992
Conal Groom (born 1973), head coach at Seattle Rowing Center, Seattle, Washington
Conal Holmes O'Connell O'Riordan (1874–1948), Irish dramatist and novelist
Conal Keaney, Irish footballer and hurler
Conal O'Brien (born 1956), American television soap opera director
Conal Platt (born 1986), professional footballer

See also
Robbie Conal (born 1944), American guerilla poster artist noted
Saint Conal, Irish bishop who flourished in the fifth century
St Conal's Hospital, psychiatric hospital in Letterkenny, County Donegal, Ireland

Irish masculine given names